Terry F. Kirkland (born February 12, 1948) is a former provincial politician from Alberta, Canada. He was a member of the Legislative Assembly of Alberta from 1993 to 1997.

Political career
Kirkland was elected to the Alberta Legislature in the 1993 Alberta general election. He defeated the incumbent MLA, Donald H. Sparrow, to win the reconstituted Leduc electoral district for the Liberals. He ran for a second term in office in the 1997 Alberta general election but was defeated by the Progressive Conservative candidate, Albert Klapstein.

Kirkland attempted to win a seat in the Edmonton-Highlands by-election held on June 12, 2000, but was defeated by NDP leader Brian Mason.

References

External links
Legislative Assembly of Alberta Members Listing

Alberta Liberal Party MLAs
Living people
1948 births